Joseph J. Rohrer Farm, also known as Rohrer Place, is a historic farm and national historic district located in Harrison Township, Elkhart County, Indiana. The house was built in 1858, and is a two-story, three bay, frame dwelling with Federal style design elements.  It has a side gable slate roof and full-width front porch.  The property also includes the contributing old house (c. 1854), bank barn (1861), chicken house, smokehouse, and corn crib.

It was added to the National Register of Historic Places in 1990.

References

Farms on the National Register of Historic Places in Indiana
Historic districts on the National Register of Historic Places in Indiana
Federal architecture in Indiana
Houses completed in 1858
Houses in Elkhart County, Indiana
Historic districts in Elkhart County, Indiana
National Register of Historic Places in Elkhart County, Indiana